Bread Tray Mountain is a summit in St. Francois County in the U.S. state of Missouri.

Bread Tray Mountain was so named on account its outline having the shape of a bread tray.

References

Mountains of St. Francois County, Missouri
Mountains of Missouri